"The Contest" is the 51st episode of the NBC sitcom Seinfeld. The eleventh episode of the fourth season, it aired on November 18, 1992. In the episode, Jerry, George, Elaine, and Kramer hold a contest to determine who can go for the longest time without masturbating.

As NBC thought that masturbation was not a topic suitable for prime time television, the word "masturbation" is never used in the episode. The term "master of my domain", describing someone who has resisted the urge to masturbate, has since become a catchphrase in popular culture.

The writer of the episode, Larry David, won the Primetime Emmy Award for Outstanding Writing in a Comedy Series for his work. The episode was ranked number 1 on TV Guides 2009 list of "100 Greatest Episodes of All-Time".

Plot
At Monk's Café, George tells Jerry, Elaine, and Kramer that his mother caught him masturbating while reading a Glamour magazine, resulting in her falling over in shock and going to the hospital. George resolves never to masturbate again. When the others express skepticism, they make a bet over who can go the longest without masturbating. The men put up $100, while Elaine puts up $150, as the men insist it's easier for a woman to go without masturbating than a man.

Kramer fails almost immediately after seeing a naked woman in a neighboring apartment - in one of the famous moments of the series, he walks into Jerry's apartment and slams his money on the counter by saying "I'm out!". The others meet various temptations: George is distracted while visiting his mother in the hospital by an attractive nurse giving another woman a sponge bath behind a curtain; Elaine's fitness club is patronized by John F. Kennedy Jr.; and Jerry is frustrated because his girlfriend Marla, a virgin, will not have sex with him. Jerry sedates his urges by watching children's cartoons.

The remaining contestants suffer insomnia. Kennedy asks Elaine to share a cab ride Uptown; she agrees even though she is going downtown. He arranges to see her again. The pressure becomes too much for her and she drops out of the contest. While making out on the couch, Marla asks Jerry if they can have sex, claiming that she is ready. However, Jerry mentions the contest, prompting Marla to leave in disgust; Jerry then resorts to looking at the naked woman. Elaine believes that Kennedy has stood her up, but George reveals that Kennedy missed her and went with Marla. They see Kramer with the naked woman across the street and wave awkwardly when he waves to them.

That night, everyone sleeps well, but it is not revealed whether Jerry or George won. Marla is in bed with Kennedy, having finally lost her virginity to him; enraptured by the afterglow, she tells him that he was "wonderful".

Production
"The Contest" was written by Larry David. Kenny Kramer claimed that there actually was a contest which David and some friends of his held, although Kramer did not take part because he thought he could not win it. David won the contest, which lasted three weeks. When David considered using the idea for an episode of Seinfeld, he did not talk about it with Jerry Seinfeld for a considerable time, because he thought the episode was impossible for him to pitch. However, Seinfeld thought it was not offensive.

The original script was not revealed until the night before the cast read-through. The first version written by David was not as clean as the one later broadcast. The note from the censor claimed that David should not use the word "masturbate". Seinfeld decided it would be better to remove any references to what George actually did. Seinfeld claimed that what was noteworthy about "The Contest" was the "dovetailing" of the stories. He claimed that it probably would have been possible to have used the word "masturbation" in the episode (in "The Ticket"—an earlier episode in the same season—George says "you must have a good story; otherwise, it's just masturbation") although it would have probably ended up not being as funny. Part of the opening scene of the episode contains some of the script originally written for "The Seinfeld Chronicles", the pilot episode.

"The Contest" is the first episode to feature Estelle Costanza, George's mother, as an on-screen character. Estelle Harris, who played the character, had not seen Seinfeld before she auditioned; her son told her about the audition. The cast and crew commented positively on the similarity in appearance between Harris and Jason Alexander, as it made it more believable that their characters could be related.

Rachel Sweet has a cameo role in this episode as George's cousin Shelly. She appears in the scene with George and his mother in the hospital.

There are two deleted scenes in "The Contest". One features Joyce—the teacher of Elaine's fitness class—in the opening scene talking to Elaine, Jerry, and Kramer. The second features George and Estelle Costanza in the hospital, where the female patient has been moved to the room next door after Estelle complained about her nakedness.

Reception

"The Contest" is considered one of the best Seinfeld episodes, winning several awards and positive reviews from critics. David won a Primetime Emmy Award for Outstanding Writing in a Comedy Series for the episode. He also won a Writers Guild of America Award for his work on the episode. Director Tom Cherones won a Directors Guild of America Award for Outstanding Directorial Achievement in Comedy Series for this episode. He was also nominated for a Primetime Emmy Award for Outstanding Directing for a Comedy Series. TV Guide ranked the episode #1 on its list of "TV's Top 100 Episodes of All Time".

"The Contest" received a Nielsen rating of 13/19, meaning that the episode was watched by an average of 13% of households and 19% of all televisions were tuned to the episode when it was broadcast. Approximately 18.5 million people watched the episode then. The first repeat of the episode gave Seinfeld its highest ratings up until that point, with a 20.1/30 Nielsen Rating. It also received only 31 complaints from viewers, despite the subject matter. There were worries from advertisers who did not want to advertise during the episode due to the topics that were being discussed. Most regular advertisers did not broadcast adverts during the show, because the series did not have good ratings at the time.

The episode is considered by most reviewers as a success for being able to cover a controversial subject in an inoffensive manner. Jonathan Boudreaux for tvdvdreviews.com said: "The Emmy-winning script by Larry David introduced the brilliant euphemism 'master of my domain' to our lexicon and helped the series to truly become must-see TV. We know what the episode is about, but the script never explicitly says it. "The Contest" effortlessly takes a potentially incendiary subject and renders it utterly inoffensive yet hilarious." He also said that "The Contest" was "one of the series' most infamous" episodes. Donna Dorsett from audaud.com commented on the refusal to use the word "masturbation," saying: "If the word had been used, even once, the show would not have been nearly as hilarious. The episode was totally inoffensive."

James Plath from DVD Town said: "Estelle Harris, as George's mother, is hilarious."

Cultural references
This is the second Seinfeld episode to feature Elaine's fondness for the Kennedy family, the first being "The Baby Shower".

Seinfeld claimed that he had never heard of the song "The Wheels on the Bus" before recording the episode.

The original script featured Jerry watching the TV series Flipper. It was changed to Tiny Toon Adventures due to concerns over music rights.

References in other works
"The Contest" is referenced in other Seinfeld episodes, the first being "The Outing", in which Jerry and George are mistakenly outed as gay. During the episode, when George visits his mother, there is a male patient in the hospital, who receives daily sponge baths from a male nurse. Although the winner of the contest is not mentioned, it is implied in "The Puffy Shirt" that George was the winner. However, as the plane is going down in "The Finale", George says he cheated, and Jerry declares himself the true winner. When Jerry asks why he cheated, George simply replies, "Because I'm a cheater!"

In the "Shaq" episode of Curb Your Enthusiasm (S02E08), Larry David and Shaquille O'Neal watch "The Contest" together. O'Neal referred to this episode of Curb Your Enthusiasm as his favorite.

"The Contest" is referenced in the Beavis and Butt-Head book "This Book Sucks" as an excuse to get out of finishing a homework assignment.

In the Family Guy episode "Jungle Love", Peter pays the people of a South American village to re-enact "The Contest" as one of them hums the Seinfeld scene-changing music. A Shaman plays Elaine, but she says "You can't spare one square?", a reference to "The Stall".

In the It's Always Sunny in Philadelphia episode "The Gang Does a Clip Show," the gang misremembers this episode as one of their schemes with Dennis and Mac both playing Jerry, Frank playing George, Charlie playing Kramer and Dee playing Elaine, in the scene where Kramer announces he's out.

In the Mystery Science Theater 3000 episode riffing on The Beast of Hollow Mountain, Crow delivers a short summary of the episode during an in-character riff.

"The Contest" was the main source of inspiration for Netflix's 2020 reality television dating show Too Hot to Handle, in which formerly promiscuous contestants are forced to abstain from sexual practices including masturbation as they try to form meaningful relationships with each other.

The Season 5 premiere of Big Mouth, titled "No Nut November", directly parodies the episode. The main characters agree to abstain from masturbation in an animated version of Monk's Café.

References

External links

1992 American television episodes
Emmy Award-winning programs
Masturbation in fiction
Seinfeld (season 4) episodes
Emmy Award-winning episodes
Television episodes written by Larry David